Waziyatawin is a Dakota professor, author, and activist from the Pezihutazizi Otunwe (Yellow Medicine Village)
in southwestern Minnesota. 
She splits her time between Minnesota and Victoria, British Columbia in Coast Salish territories.

She was a Canada Research Chair in Indigenous Peoples in the Indigenous Governance Program at the University of Victoria, 
and is recognized as a leading Indigenous intellectual. 
Her research interests include Indigenous women's roles in resisting colonialism, recovering Indigenous knowledge, and truth-telling as part of restorative justice.

Early life 
Born February 13, 1968, in Virginia, MN; daughter of Chris Mato Nunpa, Ph.D (a former Associate Professor of Indigenous Nations & Dakota Studies at Southwest Minnesota State University) and Edith Brown Travers (a social service director). Waziyatawin was born Angela Lynn Cavender, and grew up both on and off the Upper Sioux reservation. Both her parents were educators. 
She married Scott Wilson in 1992. In 2007 she legally changed her name from her married name, Angela Cavender Wilson, to Waziyatawin, a name an elder gave her as a child and which means "woman of the north".

Education and career 
She earned a double major in history and American Indian studies at the University of Minnesota in 1992, then completed masters (1996) and doctoral degrees (2000) in history at Cornell University. Her Ph.D thesis was an oral history project that she later published as Remember This! Dakota Decolonization and the Eli Taylor Narratives.

She earned tenure at Arizona State University and taught there until 2007. 
Wilson edited her first book, Indigenizing the Academy: Transforming Scholarship and Empowering Communities, in 2004 with Devon Abbott Mihesuah. In 2005, Wilson edited For Indigenous Eyes Only: A Decolonization Handbook with Michael Yellow Bird. The book compiles essays from eight indigenous American academics. In 2008, she joined the Indigenous Governance Program at the University of Victoria, saying she was interested in the program's commitment to Indigenous liberation and social action.

Waziyatawin is the author or editor of six books about Dakota history, Indigenous resistance, and decolonizing strategies.
She founded Oyate Nipi Kte, a non-profit organization dedicated to "the recovery of Dakota traditional knowledge, 
sustainable ways of being, and Dakota liberation."

Activism 
As an activist, Waziyatawin gained public attention in 2007 when she was arrested multiple times while protesting the 
Minnesota sesquicentennial celebration. 
The protests aimed to raise awareness of broken treaties and colonial violence, 
including the hanging of 38 Dakota men during the Dakota War of 1862 (the largest mass execution in American history).

In 2010, The Winona Post published a letter from a student who had attended a lecture she gave at Winona State University, 
saying she had incited violence against white people and calling her position "terrorism". 
Waziyatawin said she was subsequently contacted by the FBI,
but they later closed the case about her.
In response she told CBC News, "My position is that I don't call for violence outright but my recommendation does not preclude the use of violence for indigenous self-defence — the defence of our populations or defence of our land base... Never have I advocated violence against white settlers."

In 2011, she travelled to Palestine with a group of Indigenous and women of color scholars and artists including Angela Davis, Chandra Talpade Mohanty, and Ayoka Chenzira. Afterwards the group published a statement endorsing the Boycott, Divestment and Sanctions (BDS) movement.
Waziyatawin has drawn connections between the Israeli-Palestinian conflict and colonialism in North America.

Bibliography
 For Indigenous Minds Only: A Decolonization Handbook, Santa Fe: School of Advanced Research Press, 2012.
 What Does Justice Look Like? The Struggle for Liberation in Dakota Homeland, St. Paul: Living Justice Press, 2008.
 In the Footsteps of Our Ancestors: The Dakota Commemorative Marches of the 21st Century, St. Paul: Living Justice Press, 2006.
 Remember This! Dakota Decolonization and the Eli Taylor Narratives, Lincoln: University of Nebraska Press, 2005.
 For Indigenous Eyes Only: A Decolonization Handbook, Santa Fe: School for Advanced Research Press, 2005.
 Indigenizing the Academy: Transforming Scholarship and Empowering Communities, Lincoln: University of Nebraska Press, 2004.

References

External links
 Oyate Nipi Kte

Academic staff of the University of Victoria
Cornell University alumni
Dakota people
Native American academics
Native American women academics
American women academics
Living people
Canada Research Chairs
Native American activists
Year of birth missing (living people)
Academics from Minnesota
Activists from Minnesota
People from Yellow Medicine County, Minnesota
21st-century Native American women
21st-century Native Americans
21st-century American women educators
21st-century American educators